Farah Dani El Tayar (born 10 December 2003) is a Lebanese footballer who plays as a winger for Florida International University FIU.

Club career 
On 3 August 2021, El Tayar moved to the FIU Panthers, the team of the Florida International University. She made her debut on 22 August, as a 19th-minute substitute in a 3–2 defeat to the Jacksonville Dolphins; she was subbed out nine minutes later.

On 18 April 2022, El Tayar joined the Iowa Raptors FC in the Women's Premier Soccer League.

International career 
El Tayar made her international debut for Lebanon on 8 April 2021, coming on as a substitute in the 2021 Armenia International Friendly Tournament against hosts Armenia. She scored her first goal two days later, in a 7–1 defeat against Lithuania in the same competition.

Career statistics

International
Scores and results list Lebanon's goal tally first, score column indicates score after each El Tayar goal.

Honours 
Lebanon U15
 WAFF U-15 Girls Championship: runner-up: 2018

Lebanon U18
 WAFF U-18 Girls Championship: 2019

See also
 List of Lebanon women's international footballers

References

External links
 Profile at WPSL
 Profile at the FIU Panthers
 
 

2003 births
Living people
People from Aley District
Lebanese women's footballers
Women's association football wingers
Akhaa Ahli Aley FC (women) players
Stars Association for Sports players
FIU Panthers women's soccer players
Iowa Raptors FC (women) players
Women's Premier Soccer League players
Lebanese Women's Football League players
Lebanon women's youth international footballers
Lebanon women's international footballers
Lebanese expatriate women's footballers
Lebanese expatriate sportspeople in the United States
Expatriate women's soccer players in the United States
21st-century Lebanese women